Remains to Be Seen is a 1953 crime musical comedy film directed by Don Weis and starring June Allyson, Van Johnson and Louis Calhern. It is based on the 1951 Broadway play Remains to Be Seen by Russel Crouse and Howard Lindsay.

Plot
A girl vocalist and her apartment manager get mixed up in a creepy Park Avenue murder and find themselves facing danger at every turn.

Cast

 June Allyson as  Jody Revere
 Van Johnson as  Waldo Williams
 Louis Calhern as Benjamin Goodman
 Angela Lansbury as Valeska Chauvel
 John Beal as Dr. Glenson 
 Dorothy Dandridge as  herself
 Barry Kelley as  Lt. O'Flair
 Sammy White as Ben
 Kathryn Card as Mrs. West
 Paul Harvey as Mr. Bennett
 Helene Millard as Mrs. Bennett
 Peter Chong as Ling Tan
 Charles Lane as Delapp, examiner
 Larry J. Blake as 	Detective Minetti 
 Morgan Farley as 	Kyle Manning
 Howard Freeman as Clark
 Frank Nelson as Fleming
 Robert Foulk as Officer Miller
 Stuart Holmes as Travis Revercombe
 Ernö Verebes as Waiter

Reception
According to MGM records, the film earned $697,000 in the US and Canada and $242,000 elsewhere, making a loss to the studio of $438,000.

Songs
"Toot, Toot, Tootsie (Goo' Bye!)" – sung and danced by June Allyson and Van Johnson 
"Taking a Chance on Love" – sung by Dorothy Dandridge 
"Too Marvelous for Words" – sung by Van Johnson, then sung by June Allyson, then reprised by Van Johnson and June Allyson

References

External links
Remains to be Seen at TCMDB

1953 films
Metro-Goldwyn-Mayer films
1953 musical comedy films
American musical comedy films
American black-and-white films
Films set in New York City
American films based on plays
Films directed by Don Weis
1950s English-language films
1950s American films